Lorenzo Miguel Lucero Palma (born 30 May 1951) is a Mexican politician affiliated with the Institutional Revolutionary Party. As of 2014 he served as Deputy of the LVI and LIX Legislatures of the Mexican Congress representing Chihuahua.

References

1951 births
Living people
People from Ciudad Juárez
Institutional Revolutionary Party politicians
Deputies of the LIX Legislature of Mexico
Members of the Chamber of Deputies (Mexico) for Chihuahua (state)